The 1938 Miami Redskins football team was an American football team that represented Miami University as a member of the Buckeye Athletic Association (BAA) during the 1938 college football season. In their seventh season under head coach Frank Wilton, the Redskins compiled a 6–3 record.

Schedule

References

Miami
Miami RedHawks football seasons
Miami Redskins football